Victoria Corderi (born 1957) is an American journalist and recipient of three national news Emmys and a George Foster Peabody Award for Excellence in Journalism.  She is also a 1997 recipient of the Edward R. Murrow Award for investigative journalism.

Early life
Corderi is a graduate of St. Bonaventure University with a Bachelor of Arts in journalism. She is married and has four children.

Career
Corderi was a reporter with The Miami News, a defunct afternoon newspaper. She then began as a reporter for WPLG-TV in Miami in 1982.

Corderi covered the 1985 8.0 magnitude earthquake in Chile for CBS News.  At CBS, she served as a correspondent for the newsmagazines 48 Hours and Street Stories and as news anchor for the CBS Morning News, as well as anchoring CBS Newsbreaks in between programming.

In September 1992, Corderi was hired by WABC-TV. She was brought in to be the co-anchor for the station's freshly launched midday Eyewitness News broadcast alongside morning co-anchor and future Fox News contributor E.D. Hill and to serve as a reporter for other newscasts. Corderi's tenure there was a short one, as she was only at WABC for eighteen months.

Corderi was employed at NBC News starting in 1994 as a correspondent for Dateline NBC.

Corderi is a recipient of the Las Primeras Award for being one of the first Hispanic network anchors. She is listed in Who's Who Among Hispanic Americans.  She is also a recipient of the Gerald Loeb Award bestowed by the UCLA Anderson School of Management.

References
https://web.archive.org/web/20120222053450/http://www.anderson.ucla.edu/x5088.xml

St. Bonaventure University alumni
Living people
Hispanic and Latino American women journalists
1957 births
American women journalists
CBS News people
21st-century American women